Aphanotorulus emarginatus is a species of catfish in the family Loricariidae. It is native to South America, where it occurs in the Amazon River basin. The species reaches 15 cm (5.9 inches) in total length. It is known to be a facultative air-breather. 

A. emarginatus was originally described as Hypostomus emarginatus by Achille Valenciennes in 1840, although it was transferred to the genus Squaliforma (now considered invalid) after the genus' designation by I. J. H. Isbrücker, I. Seidel, J. Michels, E. Schraml, and A. Werner in 2001. In 2004, Jonathan W. Armbruster classified the species within Hypostomus instead of Squaliforma. In 2016, following a review of Isorineloricaria and Aphanotorulus by C. Keith Ray and Armbruster (both of Auburn University), the species was reclassified as a member of Aphanotorulus, although FishBase still lists the species as Squaliforma emarginata.

A. emarginatus appears in the aquarium trade, where it is typically referred to either as the red-fin thresher pleco or by one of five associated L-numbers, which are L-011, L-035, L-108, and L-116.

References 

Loricariidae
Fish of the Amazon basin
Fish described in 1840